Yasser Basuhai (Arabic: ياسر باصهي) (born 27 March 1979) is a Yemeni football forward.

Basuhai scored four goals for Yemen in the 2004 AFC Asian Cup qualifying round.

Honours

Club
Al-Hilal
Yemeni League: 2
 2007–08, 2008–09
Yemeni President Cup: 2
2005, 2008
Yemeni September 26 Cup: 1
2003

References

External links 
 

1979 births
Living people
Yemeni footballers
Yemen international footballers
Association football forwards
Footballers at the 2002 Asian Games
Al-Hilal Al-Sahili players
Yemeni League players
Asian Games competitors for Yemen
People from Al Hudaydah Governorate